Dimitris Tsovolas (4 September 1942 – 25 February 2022) was a Greek politician who served as Minister of Finance from 1985 to 1989.

Early life and education
Tsovolas was born at Melissourgoi, a village outside Arta, Epirus in 1942. He went on to study law at the Aristotle University of Thessaloniki. He worked as a lawyer in Arta.

Political career
Tsovolas later began his career in politics as a member of PASOK. He was first elected member of the Parliament representing Arta in 1977. He was reelected in 1981 and 1985. He was then elected as an MP for northern Athens.

Tsovolas served in the Ministry of Finance in Andreas Papandreou's government from 1981 to 1989, serving as a deputy minister from 1981 to 1985, and as the full Minister of Finance from 1985 to 1989.

In 1989 he was tried for the so-called Koskotas scandal and was sentenced to 2 years in prison and 3 years lack of his political rights. 

In October 1995 he left PASOK and on 20 December that year he founded the Democratic Social Movement.

Personal life and death
Tsovolas was married and had two children. He died on 25 February 2022, at the age of 79.

Honours
Tsovolas was awarded the highest Order of the FRY from Slobodan Milosević on 11 December 1999.

References

1942 births
2022 deaths
Democratic Social Movement politicians
Finance ministers of Greece
20th-century Greek lawyers
Greek politicians convicted of crimes
PASOK politicians
Deaths from cancer in Greece
People from Arta (regional unit)